This article is about the demographic features of the population of the Isle of Man.

Vital statistics

References

External links
 2001 Manx Census, overview and details (archived from the original on 7 June 2011)

 
Society of the Isle of Man